The 205th (2nd Welsh Border) Brigade was a formation of  the British Army during the First World War. It was raised as a second line brigade, part of the 68th (2nd Welsh) Division, from those men in the Territorial Force who had not agreed to serve overseas. The second line infantry battalions had a minimum strength of 600 men.

Formation
51st Graduated Battalion Royal Warwickshire Regiment
52nd Graduated Battalion Royal Warwickshire Regiment
233rd Graduated Battalion, became the 52nd Graduated Battalion King's Regiment (Liverpool)
52nd Graduated Battalion King's Regiment (Liverpool).
234th Graduated Battalion., became the 52nd Graduated Battalion Welsh Regiment
52nd Graduated Battalion Welsh Regiment
2/1st Battalion Monmouthshire Regiment
2/2nd Battalion Monmouthshire Regiment
2/3rd Battalion Monmouthshire Regiment
2/1st Battalion Herefordshire Regiment

References

Infantry brigades of the British Army in World War I
B205